The Tay Bridge disaster occurred during a violent storm on Sunday 28 December 1879, when the first Tay Rail Bridge collapsed as a North British Railway (NBR) passenger train on the Edinburgh to Aberdeen Line from Burntisland bound for its final destination of Dundee passed over it, killing all aboard. The bridge—designed by Sir Thomas Bouch—used lattice girders supported by iron piers, with cast iron columns and wrought iron cross-bracing. The piers were narrower and their cross-bracing was less extensive and robust than on previous similar designs by Bouch.

Bouch had sought expert advice on wind loading when designing a proposed rail bridge over the Firth of Forth; as a result of that advice he had made no explicit allowance for wind loading in the design of the Tay Bridge. There were other flaws in detailed design, in maintenance, and in quality control of castings, all of which were, at least in part, Bouch's responsibility.

Bouch died less than a year after the disaster, his reputation ruined. Bouch's design for the Forth Bridge was not used.

Bridge

Construction of the original Tay Rail Bridge began in 1871. In its initial design, the bridge was to be supported by brick piers resting on bedrock. Trial borings had shown the bedrock to lie at no great depth under the river. At either end of the bridge, the bridge girders were deck trusses, the tops of which were level with the pier tops, with the single-track railway running on top. However, in the centre section of the bridge (the "high girders") the bridge girders ran as through trusses above the pier tops (with the railway inside them) in order to give the required clearance to allow passage of sailing ships to Perth.

The bedrock lay much deeper than the trial borings had shown, and the bridge's designer, Sir Thomas Bouch, redesigned the span with fewer piers and correspondingly longer girders. The pier foundations were now constructed by sinking brick-lined wrought iron caissons onto the riverbed, and filling these with concrete. To reduce the weight these had to support, Bouch used open-lattice iron skeleton piers; each pier had multiple cast-iron columns taking the weight of the bridging girders. Wrought iron horizontal braces and diagonal tiebars linked the columns in each pier to provide rigidity and stability.

The basic concept was well known, but for the Tay Rail Bridge, the pier dimensions were constrained by the caisson. For the higher portion of the bridge, there were thirteen girder spans. In order to accommodate thermal expansion, at only three of their fourteen piers was there a fixed connection from the pier to the girders. There were therefore three divisions of linked high girder spans, the spans in each division being structurally connected to each other, but not to neighbouring spans in other divisions. The southern and central divisions were nearly level, but the northern division descended towards Dundee at gradients of up to 1 in 73.

The bridge was built by Hopkin Gilkes and Company (Gilkes), a Middlesbrough company which had worked previously with Bouch on iron viaducts. Gilkes, having first intended to produce all ironwork on Teesside, used a foundry at Wormit to produce the cast iron components, and to carry out limited post-casting machining. Gilkes were in some financial difficulty; they ceased trading in 1880, but had begun liquidation in May 1879, before the disaster. Bouch's brother had been a director of Gilkes, and all three had been colleagues on the Stockton and Darlington thirty years previously; on Edgar Gilkes's death in January 1876, Bouch had inherited shares valued at £35,000, but also owed for a guarantee of £100,000 of Gilkes borrowings and had been unable to extricate himself.

The change in design increased cost and necessitated delay, intensified after two of the high girders fell when being lifted into place in February 1877. The first engine crossed the bridge seven months later. A Board of Trade inspection was conducted over three days of good weather in February 1878; the bridge was passed for use by passenger traffic, subject to a  speed limit. The inspection report noted:

When again visiting the spot I should wish, if possible, to have an opportunity of observing the effects of high wind when a train of carriages is running over the bridge.

The bridge was opened for passenger services on 1 June 1878. Bouch was knighted in June 1879 soon after Queen Victoria had used the bridge.

Disaster
On the evening of Sunday 28 December 1879, a violent storm (10 to 11 on the Beaufort scale) was blowing virtually at right angles to the bridge. Witnesses said the storm was as bad as any they had seen in the 20–30 years they had lived in the area; one called it a 'hurricane', as bad as a typhoon he had experienced in the China Sea. The wind speed was measured at Glasgow –  (averaged over an hour) – and Aberdeen, but not at Dundee.

Higher windspeeds were recorded over shorter intervals, but at the inquiry an expert witness warned of their unreliability and declined to estimate conditions at Dundee from readings taken elsewhere.

Use of the Tay Rail Bridge was restricted to one train at a time by a signalling block system using a baton as a token. At 7:13 p.m. a North British Railway (NBR) passenger train from Burntisland (consisting of a 4-4-0 locomotive, its tender, five passenger carriages, and a luggage van) slowed to pick up the baton from the signal cabin at the south end of the bridge, then headed out onto the bridge, picking up speed.

He had also seen this on the previous train. During the inquiry, testimony was heard that the wind was pushing the wheel flanges into contact with the running rail. John Black, a passenger on the previous train that crossed the bridge, explained that the guard rails protecting against derailment were slightly higher than and inboard of the running rails. This arrangement would catch the good wheel where derailment was by disintegration of a wheel, which was a real risk before steel wheels, and had occurred in the Shipton-on-Cherwell train crash on Christmas Eve 1874.

The sparks continued for no more than three minutes, by which time the train was in the high girders. At that point "there was a sudden bright flash of light, and in an instant there was total darkness, the tail lamps of the train, the sparks and the flash of light all ... disappearing at the same instant." The signalman saw none of this and did not believe it when told. When the train failed to appear on the line off the bridge into Dundee he tried to talk to the signal cabin at the north end of the bridge, but found that all communication with it had been lost.

Not only was the train in the river, but so were the high girders and much of the ironwork of their supporting piers. Divers exploring the wreckage later found the train still within the girders, with the engine in the fifth span of the southern 5-span division. There were no survivors; only 46 bodies were recovered out of 59 known victims. Fifty-six tickets for Dundee had been collected from passengers on the train before crossing the bridge; allowing for season ticket holders, tickets for other destinations, and for railway employees, 74 or 75 people were believed to have been on the train. It has been suggested that there were no unknown victims and that the higher figure of 75 arises from double-counting in an early newspaper report in the Dundee Courier, but the inquiry did not take its casualty figures from the press; it took sworn evidence and did its own sums.

Court of inquiry

Evidence
A court of inquiry (a judicial enquiry under Section 7 of the Regulation of Railways Act 1871 "into the causes of, and circumstances attending" the accident) was immediately set up: Henry Cadogan Rothery, Commissioner of Wrecks, presided; supported by Inspector of Railways William Yolland and William Henry Barlow, President of the Institution of Civil Engineers. By 3 January 1880, they were taking evidence in Dundee; they then appointed Henry Law, a qualified civil engineer, to undertake detailed investigations. Whilst awaiting his report they held further hearings in Dundee (26 February – 3 March); having got it they sat at Westminster (19 April – 8 May) to consider the engineering aspects of the collapse. 

By then the railway, the bridge's contractor and Bouch had separate legal representation, and the NBR had sought independent advice from James Brunlees and John Cochrane, both engineers with extensive experience of major cast iron structures. The terms of reference did not specify the underlying purpose of the inquiry – to prevent a repetition, to allocate blame, to apportion liability or culpability, or to establish what precisely had happened. This led to difficulties (culminating in clashes) during the Westminster sessions. When the court reported their findings at the end of June, there was both an Inquiry Report signed by Barlow and Yolland and a minority report by Rothery.

Other eyewitnesses
Two witnesses, viewing the high girders from the north almost end-on, had seen the lights of the train as far as the 3rd–4th high girder, when they disappeared; this was followed by three flashes from the high girders north of the train. One witness said these advanced to the north end of the high girders with about fifteen seconds between first and last; the other that they were all at the north end, with less time between. A third witness had seen "a mass of fire fall from the bridge" at the north end of the high girders. A fourth said he had seen a girder fall into the river at the north end of the high girders, then a light had briefly appeared in the southern high girders, disappearing when another girder fell; he made no mention of fire or flashes.
'Ex-Provost' Robertson had a good view of most of the bridge from his house in Newport-on-Tay, but other buildings blocked his view of the southern high girders. He had seen the train move onto the bridge; then in the northern high girders, before the train could have reached them, he saw "two columns of spray illuminated with the light, first one flash and then another" and could no longer see the lights on the bridge; the only inference he could draw was that the lit columns of spray – slanting from north to south at about 75 degrees – were areas of spray lit up by the bridge lights as it turned over.

How the bridge was used – speed of trains and oscillation of bridge
Ex-provost Robertson had bought a season ticket between Dundee and Newport at the start of November, and became concerned about the speed of north-bound local trains through the high girders, which had been causing perceptible vibration, both vertical and lateral. After complaining on three occasions to the stationmaster at Dundee, with no effect on train speed, after mid-December he had used his season ticket to travel south only, using the ferry for north-bound crossings.

Robertson had timed the train with his pocket watch, and to give the railway the benefit of the doubt he had rounded up to the nearest five seconds. The measured time through the girders was normally 65 or 60 seconds, but twice it had been 50 seconds. When observing from the shore, he had measured 80 seconds for trains travelling through the girders, but not on any train he had travelled on. North-bound local trains were often held up to avoid delaying expresses, and then made up time while travelling over the bridge. The gradient onto the bridge at the northern end prevented similar high speeds on south-bound locals. Robertson said that the movement he observed was hard to quantify, although the lateral movement, which was probably , was definitely due to the bridge, not the train, and the effect was more marked at high speed.

Four other train passengers supported Robertson's timings but only one had noticed any movement of the bridge. The Dundee stationmaster had passed Robertson's complaint about speed (he had been unaware of any concern about oscillation) on to the drivers, and then checked times from cabin to cabin (at either end of the bridge the train was travelling slowly to pick up or hand over the baton). However he had never checked speed through the high girders.

Painters who had worked on the bridge in mid-1879 said that it shook when a train was on it. When a train entered the southern high girders the bridge had shaken at the north end, both east–west and, more strongly, up-and-down. The shaking was worse when trains were going faster, which they did: "when the Fife boat was nearly over and the train had only got to the south end of the bridge it was a hard drive". A joiner who had worked on the bridge from May to October 1879 also spoke of a lateral shaking, which was more alarming than the up-and-down motion, and greatest at the southern junction between the high girders and the low girders. He was unwilling to quantify the amplitude of motion, but when pressed he offered . When pressed further he would only say that it was distinct, large, and visible.

How the bridge was maintained – chattering ties and cracked columns
The North British Railway maintained the tracks, but it retained Bouch to supervise maintenance of the bridge. He appointed Henry Noble as his bridge inspector. Noble, who was a bricklayer, not an engineer, had worked for Bouch on the construction of the bridge.

Whilst checking the pier foundations to see if the river bed was being scoured from around them, Noble had become aware that some diagonal tie bars were 'chattering', and in October 1878 had begun remedying this. Diagonal bracing was by flat bars running from one lug at a column section top to two sling plates bolted to a lug at the base of the equivalent section on an adjacent column. The bar and sling plates all had a matching longitudinal slot in them. The tie bar was placed between the sling plates with all three slots aligned and overlapping, and then a gib was driven through all three slots and secured. Two "cotters" (metal wedges) were then positioned to fill the rest of the slot overlap, and driven in hard to put the tie under tension.

Noble had assumed the cotters were too small and had not been driven up hard in the first place, but on the chattering ties the cotters were loose, and even if driven fully in would not fill the slot and put the bar under tension. By fitting an additional packing piece between loose cotters and driving the cotters in, Noble had re-tightened loose ties and stopped them chattering. There were over 4,000 gib and cotter joints on the bridge, but Noble said that only about 100 had had to be re-tensioned, most in October–November 1878. On his last check in December 1879, only two ties had needed attention, both on piers north of the high girders. Noble had found cracks in four column sections – one under the high girders, three to the north of them – which had then been bound with wrought iron hoops. Noble had consulted Bouch about the cracked columns, but not the chattering ties.

How the bridge was built – the Wormit foundry
The workers at the Wormit foundry complained that the columns had been cast using 'Cleveland iron', which always had scum on it—it was less easy to cast than 'good Scotch metal' and more likely to give defective castings. Moulds were damped with salt water, cores were inadequately fastened, and moved, giving uneven column wall thickness. The foundry foreman explained that where lugs had been imperfectly cast; the missing metal was added by 'burning on'. If a casting had blowholes or other casting defects considered to be minor faults, they were filled with 'Beaumont egg' (of which the foreman kept a stock for that purpose) and the casting was used.

How the bridge was built – management and inspection
Gilkes' site staff were inherited from the previous contractor. Under the resident engineer there were seven subordinates including a foundry manager. The original foundry manager left before most of the high girders pier column sections were cast. His replacement was also supervising erection of the bridge, and had no previous experience of supervising foundry work. He was aware of 'burning on', but the use of Beaumont egg had been hidden from him by the foreman. When shown defects in bridge castings, he said he would not have passed the affected columns for use, nor would he have passed columns with noticeably uneven wall thickness. According to his predecessor, burning-on had only been carried out on temporary 'lifting columns', which were used to allow the girders to be lifted into place and were not part of the permanent bridge structure. That was on the instructions of the resident engineer, who had little foundry experience either and relied upon the foreman.

Whilst the working practices were the responsibility of Gilkes, their contract with NBR provided that all work done by the contractor was subject to the approval of the workmanship by Bouch. Hence Bouch would share the blame for any resulting defective work in the finished bridge. The original foundry foreman, who had been dismissed for drunkenness, vouched for Gilkes personally testing for unevenness in the early castings: "Mr. Gilkes, sometimes once a fortnight and sometimes once a month, would tap a column with a hammer, first on one side and then on the other, and he used to go over most of them in that way sounding them." Bouch had spent over £9,000 on inspection (his total fee was £10,500) but did not produce any witness who had inspected castings on his behalf. Bouch himself had been up about once a week whilst the design was being changed, but "afterwards, when it was all going on, I did not go so often".

Bouch kept his own 'resident engineer', William Paterson, who looked after the construction of the bridge, its approaches, the line to Leuchars, and the Newport branch. Paterson was also the engineer of the Perth General Station. Bouch told the court that Paterson's age was 'very much mine' but, in fact, Paterson was 12 years older and, by the time of the Inquiry, paralysed and unable to give evidence. Another inspector appointed later was by then in South Australia and also unable to give evidence. Gilkes' managers could not vouch for any inspection of castings by Bouch's inspectors. The completed bridge had been inspected on Bouch's behalf for quality of assembly, but that was after the bridge had been painted (though still before the bridge opened, and before the painter witnesses were on it in the summer of 1879), which hid any cracks or signs of burning-on (though the inspector said that, in any case, he would not know those signs on sight). Throughout construction, Noble had been looking after foundations and brickwork.

"The evidence of the ruins"

Henry Law had examined the remains of the bridge; he reported defects in workmanship and design detail. Cochrane and Brunlees, who gave evidence later, largely concurred.

Bridge materials
Samples of the bridge materials, both cast and wrought iron, were tested by David Kirkaldy, as were a number of bolts, tiebars, and associated lugs. Both the wrought and cast iron had good strength, while the bolts "were of sufficient strength and proper iron". However, both ties and sound lugs failed at loadings of about 20 tons, well below what had been expected. Both ties and lugs were weakened by high local stresses where the bolt bore on them. Four of the fourteen lugs tested were unsound, having failed at lower than expected loadings. Some column top lugs outlasted the wrought iron, but the bottom lugs were significantly weaker.

Opinions and analysis

Windloading

Windloading assumed in design
Bouch had designed the bridge, assisted in his calculations by Allan Stewart. After the accident Stewart had assisted William Pole in calculating what the bridge should have withstood. On the authority of Stewart they had assumed that the bridge was designed against a wind loading of  'with the usual margin of safety'. Bouch said that whilst  had been discussed, he had been "guided by the report on the Forth Bridge" to assume  and therefore made no special allowance for wind loading.
He was referring to advice given by the Astronomer Royal, Sir George Biddell Airy in 1873 when consulted about Bouch's design for a suspension bridge across the Firth of Forth; that wind pressures as high as  might be encountered very locally, but averaged over a  span  would be a reasonable allowance. This advice had been endorsed by a number of eminent engineers.

Opinions on windloading allowance
Evidence was taken from scientists on the current state of knowledge on wind loading and from engineers on the allowance they made for it. Airy said that the advice given was specific to suspension bridges and the Forth;  could act over an entire span of the Tay Bridge and he would now advise designing to (i.e.  with the usual margin of safety).

Sir George Stokes agreed with Airy that 'catspaws', ripples on the water produced by gusts, could have a width of several hundred yards. Standard wind pressure measurements were of hydrostatic pressure which had to be corrected by a factor of 1.4–2 to give total wind loading – with a  wind this would be .

Brunlees had made no allowance for wind loading on the Solway viaduct because the spans were short and low – if he had had to, he would probably have designed against  with a safety margin of 4–5 (by limiting strength of iron). Both Pole and Law had used a treatment from a book by Rankine. It does not do to speculate upon whether it is a fair estimate or not". Pole had ignored it because no reference was given; he did not believe any engineer paid any attention to it when designing bridges; he thought  a reasonable allowance; this was what Robert Stephenson had assumed for the Britannia Bridge. He doubted Rankine's pressures because he was not an experimentalist; told that the data were observations by the Regius Professor of Astronomy at Glasgow University, he doubted that the Professor had the equipment to take the readings.

Baker's analysis
The Inquiry felt that these locations were significantly more sheltered, and therefore rejected this argument. Baker's subsequent work on wind pressures at the Forth Rail Bridge site showed meteorologists were overestimating, but his  might have over-interpreted the data.

Opinions on bridge components
Law had numerous criticisms of the bridge design, some echoed by other engineers:
He thought the piers should have been wider (both to counteract toppling and to increase the horizontal component forces the tiebars could withstand) and rectangular (to increase the number of tiebars directly resisting lateral forces); at the very least there should have been lateral bracing between the outermost columns of the piers.
The lug holes should have been drilled and the tiebars secured by pins filling the holes (rather than bolts). Cochrane testified that he was not surprised that boltholes had been cast conical. He noted that moulders were notorious for this, unless you stood over them. Even so, he would not rely on supervision or inspection, he would have the holes bored or reamed to ensure they were cylindrical because it had an important bearing on the stability of the structure. Pole – called by Bouch's counsel – agreed.
Bouch said if he had known the holes were cast conical he would have had them bored or reamed. Gilkes said casting lug holes conical would have been done "as a matter of course, and unless attention had been drawn to it, it would not be thought then so important as we think it now".
Cast-on lugs tended to make unsound castings (Cochrane said he had seen examples in the bridge ruins) and had prevented facing of the outer side of flanges. Cochrane added that their use meant that columns had had to be cast horizontally rather than vertically, thus giving less satisfactory castings; and unless lugs were carefully packed during bolting up they could be damaged or strained.
For so tall a pier Gilkes would have preferred some other means of attaching the ties to the columns "knowing how treacherous a thing cast iron is, but if an engineer gave me such a thing to make I should make it without question, believing that he had apportioned the strength properly". A letter from Bouch to Gilkes on 22 January 1875 had noted that Gilkes was "inclined to prefer making the joints of the metal columns the same as on the Beelah and Deepdale". Asked by Rothery why he had departed from the bracing arrangements on the Belah Viaduct, Bouch had referred to changed views on the force of the wind; pressed for other reasons he said Belah-style ties "were so much more expensive; this was a saving of money".

Modelling of bridge failure and conclusions drawn
Pole calculated the wind loading required to overturn the lightest carriage in the train (the second-class carriage) to be less than that needed to overturn the bridge; whereas Law – taking credit for more passengers in the carriage than Pole and for the high girders partially shielding carriages from the wind – had reached the opposite conclusion.

Law: causes were windloading, poor design and poor quality control
Law concluded that the bridge as designed if perfect in execution would not have failed in the way seen (Cochrane went further; it 'would be standing now'). The calculations assumed the bridge to be largely as designed, with all components in their intended position, and the ties reasonably evenly loaded. If the bridge had failed at lower wind loadings, this was evidence that the defects in design and workmanship he had objected to had given uneven loadings, significantly reduced the bridge strength and invalidated the calculation. Hence

Pole: causes were windloading and impact of derailed carriages
Pole held that the calculation was valid; the defects were self-correcting or had little effect, and some other reason for the failure should be sought. It was the cast iron lugs which had failed; cast iron was vulnerable to shock loadings, and the obvious reason for a shock loading on the lugs was one of the carriages being blown over and into a bridge girder. Baker agreed, but held the wind pressure was not sufficient to blow over a carriage; derailment was either wind-assisted by a different mechanism or coincidental. (Bouch's own view that collision damage to the girder was the sole cause of bridge collapse found little support).

"Did the Train strike the Girders?"
Bouch's counsel called witnesses last; hence his first attempts to suggest derailment and collision were made piecemeal in cross-examination of universally unsympathetic expert witnesses. Law had 'not seen anything to indicate that the carriages left the line' (before the bridge collapse) nor had Cochrane nor Brunlees. The physical evidence put to them for derailment and subsequent impact of one or more carriage with the girders was limited. It was suggested that the last two vehicles (the second-class carriage and a brake van) which appeared more damaged were those derailed, but (said Law) they were of less robust construction and the other carriages were not unscathed. Cochrane and Brunlees added that both sides of the carriages were damaged "very much alike".

Bouch pointed to the rails and their chairs being smashed up in the girder holding the last two carriages, to the axle-box of the second-class carriage having become detached and ending up in the bottom boom of the eastern girder, to the footboard on the east side of the carriage having been completely carried away, to the girders being broken up, and to marks on the girders showing contact with the carriage roof, and to a plank with wheel marks on it having been washed up at Newport but unfortunately then washed away. Bouch's assistant gave evidence of two sets of horizontal scrape marks (very slight scratches in the metal or paint on the girders) matching the heights of the roofs of the last two carriages, but did not know the heights he claimed to be matched. At the start of one of these abrasions, a rivet head had lifted and splinters of wood were lodged between a tie bar and a cover plate. Evidence was then given of flange marks on tie bars in the fifth girder (north of the two rearmost carriages), the 'collision with girders' theory being duly modified to everything behind the tender having derailed.

However, (it was countered) the girders would have been damaged by their fall regardless of its cause. They had had to be broken up with dynamite before they could be recovered from the bed of the Tay (but only after an unsuccessful attempt to lift the crucial girder in one piece which had broken many girder ties). The tender coupling (which clearly could not have hit a girder) had also been found in the bottom boom of the eastern girder. Two marked fifth girder tie bars were produced; one indeed had 3 marks, but two of them were on the underside. Dugald Drummond, responsible for NBR rolling stock, had examined the wheel flanges and found no 'bruises' – expected if they had smashed up chairs. If the second-class carriage body had hit anything at speed, it would have been 'knocked all to spunks' without affecting the underframe. Had collision with the eastern girder slewed the frame, it would have presented the east side to the oncoming brake van, but it was the west side of the frame that was more damaged. Its eastern footboard had not been carried away; the carriage had never had one (on either side). Drummond did not think the carriages had left the rails until after the girders began to fall, nor had he ever known a carriage (light or heavy) to be blown over by the wind.

Findings
The three members of the court failed to agree a report although there was much common ground:

Contributory factors
 neither the foundations nor the girders were at fault
 the quality of the wrought iron, whilst not of the best, was not a factor
the cast iron was also fairly good, but presented difficulty in casting
 the workmanship and fitting of the piers were inferior in many respects
the cross bracing of the piers and its fastenings were too weak to resist heavy gales. Rothery complained that the cross-bracing was not as substantial or as well-fitted as on the Belah viaduct; Yolland and Barlow stated that the weight/cost of cross-bracing was a disproportionately small fraction of the total weight/cost of ironwork
 there was insufficiently strict supervision of the Wormit foundry (a great apparent reduction of strength in the cast iron was attributable to the fastenings bringing the stress on the edges of the lugs, rather than acting fairly on them)
supervision of the bridge after completion was unsatisfactory; Noble had no experience of ironwork nor any definite instruction to report on the ironwork
nonetheless Noble should have reported the loose ties. Using packing pieces might have fixed the piers in a distorted form.
the  limit had not been enforced, and frequently exceeded.
Rothery added that, given the importance to the bridge design of the test borings showing shallow bedrock, Bouch should have taken greater pains, and looked at the cores himself.

"True Cause of the Fall of The Bridge"
According to Yolland and Barlow "the fall of the bridge was occasioned by the insufficiency of the cross-bracings and fastenings to sustain the force of the gale on the night of December 28th 1879 ... the bridge had been previously strained by other gales".
Rothery agreed, asking "Can there be any doubt that what caused the overthrow of the bridge was the pressure of the wind acting upon a structure badly built and badly maintained?"

Substantive differences between reports
Yolland and Barlow also noted the possibility that failure was by fracture of a leeward column. He therefore concluded – with (he claimed) the support of circumstantial evidence – that the bridge might well have failed at the north end first; he explicitly dismissed the claim that the train had hit the girders before the bridge fell.

Yolland and Barlow concluded that the bridge had failed at the south end first; and made no explicit finding as to whether the train had hit the girders. They noted instead that apart from Bouch himself, Bouch's witnesses claimed/conceded that the bridge failure was due to a shock loading on lugs heavily stressed by windloading. Their report is therefore consistent with either a view that the train had not hit the girder or one that a bridge with cross-bracing giving an adequate safety margin against windloading would have survived a train hitting the girder.

Yolland and Barlow noted "there is no requirement issued by the Board of Trade respecting wind pressure, and there does not appear to be any understood rule in the engineering profession regarding wind pressure in railway structures; and we therefore recommend the Board of Trade should take such steps as may be necessary for the establishment of rules for that purpose."

Presentational differences between reports
Rothery's minority report is more detailed in its analysis, more willing to blame named individuals, and more quotable, but the official report of the court is a relatively short one signed by Yolland and Barlow. Rothery said that his colleagues had declined to join him in allocating blame, on the grounds that this was outside their terms of reference. However, previous Section 7 inquiries had clearly felt themselves free to blame (Thorpe rail accident) or exculpate (Shipton-on-Cherwell train crash) identifiable individuals as they saw fit, and when Bouch's solicitor checked with Yolland and Barlow, they denied that they agreed with Rothery that "For these defects both in the design, the construction, and the maintenance, Sir Thomas Bouch is, in our opinion, mainly to blame."

Aftermath

Section 7 inquiries
No further judicial enquiries under Section 7 of the Regulation of Railways Act 1871 were held until the Hixon rail crash in 1968 brought into question both the policy of the Railway Inspectorate towards automated level crossings and the management by the Ministry of Transport (the Inspectorate's parent government department) of the movement of abnormal loads. A Section 7 judicial enquiry was felt necessary to give the required degree of independence. The structure and terms of reference were better defined than for the Tay Bridge inquiry. Brian Gibbens, QC, was supported by two expert assessors, and made findings as to blame/responsibility but not as to liability/culpability.

Wind Pressure (Railway Structures) Commission
The Board of Trade set up a 5-man commission (Barlow, Yolland, Sir John Hawkshaw, Sir William Armstrong and Stokes) to consider what wind loading should be assumed when designing railway bridges.

Windspeeds were normally measured in 'miles run in hour' (i.e. windspeed averaged over one hour) so it was difficult to apply Smeaton's table which linked wind pressure to current windspeed

where:
is the instantaneous wind pressure (pounds per square foot)
is the instantaneous air velocity in miles per hour

By examination of recorded pressures and windspeeds at Bidston Observatory, the commission found that for high winds the highest wind pressure could be represented very fairly, by

where:
is the maximum instantaneous wind pressure experienced (pounds per square foot)
is the 'miles run in hour' (one hour average windspeed) in miles per hour

They noted that higher wind pressures had been recorded at Bidston Observatory but these would still give loadings well within the recommended safety margins. The wind pressures reported at Bidston were probably anomalously high because of peculiarities of the site (one of the highest points on the Wirral.): a wind pressure of  would overturn railway carriages and such events were a rarity.

Bridges

Work started 6 July 1883 and the bridge opened on 13 July 1887. Sir John Fowler and Sir Benjamin Baker designed the Forth Rail Bridge, built (also by Arrols) between 1883 and 1890. Baker and his colleague Allan Stewart received the major credit for design and overseeing building work. The Forth Bridge had a 40 mph speed limit, which was not well observed.

Bouch had also been engineer for the North British, Arbroath and Montrose Railway, which included an iron viaduct over the South Esk. Examined closely after the Tay bridge collapse, the viaduct as built did not match the design, and many of the piers were noticeably out of the perpendicular. It was suspected that the construction had not been adequately supervised: foundation piles had not been driven deeply or firmly enough. Tests in 1880 over a period of 36 hours using both dead and rolling loads led to the structure becoming seriously distorted and eight of the piers were declared unsafe. Condemning the structure, Colonel Yolland also stated his opinion that "piers constructed of cast-iron columns of the dimensions used in this viaduct should not in future be sanctioned by the Board of Trade." It had to be dismantled and rebuilt by Sir William Arrol to a design by W. R. Galbraith before the line could be opened to traffic in 1881.

Reminders

The locomotive, NBR no. 224, a 4-4-0 designed by Thomas Wheatley and built at Cowlairs Works in 1871, was salvaged and repaired, remaining in service until 1919, nicknamed "The Diver"; many superstitious drivers were reluctant to take it over the new bridge. The stumps of the original bridge piers are still visible above the surface of the Tay. Memorials have been placed at either end of the bridge in Dundee and Wormit.

A column from the bridge is on display at the Dundee Museum of Transport.

On 28 December 2019, Dundee Walterfronts Walks hosted a remembrance walk to mark the 140-year anniversary of the Tay Bridge disaster.

Sabbatarian response
Some in the Sabbatarian movement, which advocated for restricting activities on Sundays, pointed to the disaster as a punishment from God for traveling on the Sabbath. James Begg, a minister of the Free Church of Scotland, criticized the railway, stating that "The Sabbath of God has been dreadfully profaned by our great public companies", and also criticized the victims, posing the question, "Is it not awful to think that they must have been carried away when many of them must have known that they were transgressing the Law of God?". Punch magazine criticized Begg for "converting the awful catastrophe triumphantly to the account of his own black and bitter creed", and accused him of violating the biblical precept "Judge not that ye be not judged".

Modern reinterpretations
Various additional pieces of evidence have been advanced in the last 40 years, leading to "forensic engineering" reinterpretations of what actually happened.

Works of literature about the disaster

The disaster inspired several songs and poems, most famously William McGonagall's "The Tay Bridge Disaster", widely considered to be of such a low quality as to be comical. The German poet Theodor Fontane, shocked by the news, wrote his poem Die Brück’ am Tay. It was published only ten days after the tragedy happened. C. Horne's ballad In Memory of the Tay Bridge Disaster was published as a broadside in May 1880. It describes the moment of the disaster as:

See also
 David Kirkaldy
 Harry Watts
 List of structural failures and collapses
 List of bridge disasters
 List of wind-related railway accidents

Notes and references

Notes

References

Bibliography

 Lewis, Peter R. Beautiful Railway Bridge of the Silvery Tay: Reinvestigating the Tay Bridge Disaster of 1879, Tempus, 2004, .
 Lewis, Peter R. Disaster on the Dee: Robert Stephenson's Nemesis of 1847, Tempus Publishing (2007) 
 
 McKean, Charles, Battle for the North: The Tay and Forth Bridges and the 19th-Century Railway Wars: The Building of the Tay and Forth Bridges and the 19th Century Railway Wars Granta 2007.
 Pease, Joseph, et al., Report from the Select Committee on the North British Railway (Tay Bridge) Bill; Together with the Proceedings of the Committee, and Minutes of Evidence. London: Her Majesty's Stationery Office, 1880.
 Prebble, John, The High Girders: The Story of the Tay Bridge Disaster, 1956 (published by Penguin Books in 1975) .
 Rapley, John Thomas Bouch: the Builder of the Tay Bridge, Stroud: Tempus, 2006, 
 Rothery, Henry Tay Bridge Disaster: Report Of The Court of Inquiry, and Report Of Mr. Rothery, Upon the Circumstances Attending the Fall of a Portion of the Tay Bridge on the 28th December 1879. London: Her Majesty's Stationery Office, 1880 .
 Swinfen, David The Fall of the Tay Bridge, Mercat Press, 1998, .
 Thomas, John The Tay Bridge Disaster: New Light on the 1879 Tragedy, David & Charles, 1972, .

External links

 91 black-and-white photographs of the wrecked piers of the Tay Bridge showing destroyed piers and girders, wreckage of train and steam engine from National Library of Scotland
 Tom Martin's engineering analysis of the bridge disaster
 Reappraisal of the Tay Bridge disaster Open University
 The Tay Bridge Disaster at Failure Magazine
 Dundee local history centre page on the disaster
Tay Victims listing {reference only}
Find a grave memorial of Tay River victims
Firth of Tay Bridge Disaster 1879: Worst Structural Disaster in British History at Suburban Emergency Management Project
 Tay Bridge Disaster: Appendix to the Report Of The Court of Inquiry. Includes a large number of drawings of the bridge, and calculations of the result of wind pressure on the structure
 Report from the Select Committee on the North British Railway (Tay Bridge) Bill; together with the Proceedings of the Committee and Mins of Ev. All the oral evidence given, reproduced verbatim –  a very large file but sometimes a useful corrective to reinterpretation by secondary sources 
The Tay Bridge Collection at Archive Services, University of Dundee
 Was Disaster Built into the First Tay Bridge? Article relating to the University of Dundee's holdings on the disaster

Transport in Dundee
Railway accidents and incidents in Scotland
Railway accidents in 1879
1879 in Scotland
19th century in Dundee
Bridge disasters in the United Kingdom
Bridge disasters caused by engineering error
Bridge disasters caused by construction error
European windstorms
Transport disasters in Scotland
Thomas Bouch
Accidents and incidents involving North British Railway
History of Dundee
December 1879 events
1879 disasters in the United Kingdom